Brandon Richard Beemer (born February 27, 1980) is an American actor and model, best known for his role in the soap operas as Shawn-Douglas Brady on Days of Our Lives (2006–08, 2016–present) and Owen Knight on The Bold and the Beautiful (2008–12).

Early life 
Beemer was born in Eugene, Oregon. He is of German and Irish ancestry. His first job was as a driver at the local Coca-Cola bottling plant. After high school, he moved to New York City and briefly modeled. There, he began taking acting classes, and soon decided to move to Los Angeles to pursue acting full-time.

Career 
Beemer played Shawn-Douglas Brady on Days of Our Lives and made his debut in the role on September 29, 2006. He replaced Jason Cook, who had played the role since October 1999. On January 21, 2008, it was reported that Beemer and his co-star Martha Madison had been fired from the show. Their last airdate was March 24, 2008. It was announced in May 2008 that Beemer would be joining the cast of The Bold and the Beautiful. Beemer made his debut on B&B, July 2, 2008. He played Owen Knight from 2008 to 2012.

In 2011, Beemer was part of the cast in the docu-reality show Dirty Soap, a new reality series following the real-lives of 5 fellow soap stars that documents both their personal and professional lives. Dirty Soap debuted on September 25, 2011, on the E! Network. On February 9, 2012, Beemer starred as psychologist Luke Parker in the first official screening of the short horror film, BloodMoon, directed by Farnaz Samiinia. In 2013, he starred in the television movie Bering Sea Beast, and also appeared on Michelle Stafford's comedy series The Stafford Project. He also portrayed Dylan in the horror-thriller film Fear Clinic.

On November 10, 2015, it was confirmed that Beemer would reprise his portrayal of Shawn-Douglas Brady on Days of Our Lives.

Filmography

Film

Television

References

External links 

1980 births
Living people
Male models from Oregon
American male soap opera actors
American male television actors
American people of German descent
American people of Irish descent
Male actors from Eugene, Oregon